Kurt Fuller (born September 16, 1953) is an American character actor. He has appeared in a number of television, film, and stage projects. He is best known for his roles in the films No Holds Barred and Ghostbusters II (both 1989), Wayne's World (1992), and Scary Movie (2000), as well as for playing Coroner Woody Strode in the television series Psych (2009–2014) and Zachariah in Supernatural (2009–2019).

Career
Fuller has played television director Russell in Wayne's World; a mayoral aide in Ghostbusters II; the television executive and mastermind of the "Battle of the Tough Guys", Mr. Brell, in No Holds Barred; a real estate agent in Elvira: Mistress of the Dark; and NSC Director Robert Lindsey in the third season of Alias. Fuller also played real-life figures Werner Klemperer (in Paul Schrader's Auto Focus) and Karl Rove (on the TV satire That's My Bush!). He also portrayed Pacific Bell Retirement Fund Executive Walter Ribbon in The Pursuit of Happyness.

Fuller has also appeared in many television shows, including Knight Rider, Timecop, Quantum Leap, L.A. Law, Murder, She Wrote, Ally McBeal, Felicity, Malcolm in the Middle, The West Wing, Boston Legal, Boston Public, House, Monk, Desperate Housewives, the live-action version of The Tick, Charmed, Carnivàle, My Name Is Earl, Ugly Betty, Glee, Drop Dead Diva and the pilot episode of NewsRadio. He has had a recurring role as Woody the Coroner on Psych and another on Supernatural, depicting a malevolent angel called Zachariah. Fuller later reprised the role for Supernatural's 300th episode "Lebanon." He also acted as a Senior Police Officer in the 2000 comedy Scary Movie, who is the commanding officer of Doofy.

In 1986, he played "Frank" in the US premiere of Steven Berkoff's play Kvetch in West Los Angeles. The following year he reprised the role Off-Broadway at the Westside Arts Theater.

From 2010 to 2011, Fuller appeared in the ABC Network series Better with You: the show was canceled after a single season.

Fuller portrayed director of the C.I.A., Grayden Osborne, in the ABC drama Scandal. He also appears in FOX's Us & Them with Jane Kaczmarek and Jason Ritter.

Personal life

Fuller was born in San Francisco, California but raised in Stockton. He is married to actress and author Jessica Hendra (daughter of actor and writer Tony Hendra) and has two daughters named Julia and Charlotte. Fuller is Jewish.

Filmography

Film

Television

Video games

References

External links
 

1952 births
American male film actors
American male television actors
Male actors from San Francisco
Living people
20th-century American male actors
21st-century American male actors
Jewish American male actors
21st-century American Jews